Thomas Woodcock VC (19 March 1888 – 27 March 1918) was an English recipient of the Victoria Cross, the highest and most prestigious award for gallantry in the face of the enemy that can be awarded to British and Commonwealth forces.

Details
Woodcock was 29 years old, and a private in the 2nd Battalion, Irish Guards, British Army during the First World War when the following deed took place for which he was awarded the VC.

On 12/13 September 1917 north of Broenbeek, Belgium, when an advanced post had held out for 96 hours and was finally forced to retire, the lance-sergeant (John Moyney) in charge of the party and Private Woodcock covered the retirement. After crossing the stream themselves, Private Woodcock heard cries for help behind him - he returned and waded into the stream amid a shower of bombs and rescued another member of the party whom he carried across open ground in daylight towards our front line, regardless of machine-gun fire.

He was killed in action at Bullecourt, France, on 27 March 1918.

Further information
He later achieved the rank of corporal. He is buried at Douchy-les-Ayette British Cemetery, France. 8m SW of Arras. Plot IV. row F. Grave 3.

The medal
His Victoria Cross is kept in Wigan, England.

References

Monuments to Courage (David Harvey, 1999)
The Register of the Victoria Cross (This England, 1997)
VCs of the First World War - Passchendaele 1917 (Stephen Snelling, 1998)

1888 births
1918 deaths
People from Wigan
British Army personnel of World War I
British World War I recipients of the Victoria Cross
Irish Guards soldiers
British military personnel killed in World War I
British Army recipients of the Victoria Cross
Military personnel from Lancashire